Javier Adolfo Altamirano Altamirano (born Javier Adolfo Urzúa Altamirano; 21 September 1999) is a Chilean footballer who plays for Huachipato.

Personal life
On 2019 Altamirano changed his surname Urzúa to Altamirano, honoring his mother and grandfather.

References

External links

1999 births
Living people
Chilean footballers
Chilean Primera División players
C.D. Huachipato footballers
Association football midfielders
People from Talcahuano